Navin Madhavprasad Singhi (born 1949) is an Indian mathematician and a Professor Emeritus at Tata Institute of Fundamental Research, Mumbai, specializing in combinatorics and graph theory. He is the recipient of the prestigious Shanti Swarup Bhatnagar Prize for Science and Technology. Singhi is known for his research in block designs, projective planes, Intersection graphs of hypergraphs, and coding theory. He was a visiting professor at IIT Mumbai, University of Mumbai, Indian Statistical Institute and other various universities in the United States and Europe.

Early life
Singhi was born in Indore and raised in Goregaon, Mumbai and earned a M.A. in mathematics from the University of Mumbai.

Career
Singhi earned a Ph.D. (1974) from the University of Mumbai, his advisor was S. S. Shrikhande. Professor Singhi is a Fellow of the Indian National Science Academy.

References

External links
 

1949 births
Living people
20th-century Indian mathematicians
Indian combinatorialists
University of Mumbai alumni
Scientists from Mumbai
Academic staff of Tata Institute of Fundamental Research
Recipients of the Shanti Swarup Bhatnagar Award in Mathematical Science